Arzamas Machine-Building Plant is a company based in Arzamas, Russia and established in 1972. It is part of the Military Industrial Company group.

The Arzamas Machine-Building Plant assembles the BTR-80 armored personnel carrier, the Tigr  4×4 multipurpose all-terrain infantry mobility vehicle, and civilian vehicles based on the same chassis.

References

External links
 Official website

Manufacturing companies of Russia
Companies based in Nizhny Novgorod Oblast
Ministry of the Defense Industry (Soviet Union)
Defence companies of the Soviet Union